Outworld was an American progressive metal band.

It may refer to:
 Outworld, a fictional realm in the Mortal Kombat franchise
 Outworld, a 1981 VIC-20 video game

Music 
 Outworld (Black Coast album), 2021
 Outworld (Outworld album), 2006

See also 
 Outer World, video game
 Outer Worlds, virtual reality
 Outer planets of the Solar System